Model 6 may refer to:

Ingram Model 6, a .45 ACP caliber submachine gun 
Boeing Model 6, a small biplane flying boat designed shortly after World War I